Essex East was a federal electoral district represented in the House of Commons of Canada from 1925 to 1968. It was located in the province of Ontario. it was created in 1924 from parts of Essex North and Essex South ridings.

It initially consisted of the towns of Ford City and Walkerville and the villages of Riverside, Tecumseh and in the townships of Maidstone, Rochester and Tilbury (North and West) in the county of Essex, and the town of Tilbury in the county of Kent.

In 1933, it was redefined to exclude Ford City and the town of Tilbury, include the towns of East Windsor and townships of Sandwich East and Sandwich South, 
and the part of the city of Windsor south of Tecumseh Road;

In 1947, it was redefined to exclude the towns of East Windsor and Walkerville and the townships of Tilbury West, and Sandwich South, and the part of the city of Windsor east of the line dividing lots facing on Lincoln Road to the east and Gladstone Avenue to the west. In 1952, it was redefined to exclude the town of Tilbury and the town of Essex.

The electoral district was abolished in 1966 when it was redistributed between Essex, Windsor West and Windsor—Walkerville ridings.

Members of Parliament

This riding elected the following members of the House of Commons of Canada:

Election results

|}

|}

|}

|}

   
|}

|}

|}

|}

|}

|}

|}

|}

|}

External links
Riding history from the Library of Parliament

Former federal electoral districts of Ontario